Bernard Soustrot (born 3 September 1945) is a French classical trumpeter. He is the brother of conductor Marc Soustrot.

Biography 
Born in Lyon, Soustrot entered the Conservatoire de Lyon at the age of 9, in classes of trumpet and cornet; four years later, he obtained a gold medal of trumpet, cornet and solfeggio. In 1970, he became a student of Maurice André at the Conservatoire de Paris. He was awarded various prizes, including in 1975 the first Trumpet Prize and won several renowned competitions, including Prague in 1974 and Geneva in 1975. In 1976 he won the first prize in the Maurice André contest.

He began his career in 1975 as a solo trumpeter in the Stuttgart Radio Symphony Orchestra under the direction of Sergiu Celibidache, then in 1976 at the Orchestre philharmonique de Radio France under the direction of Gilbert Amy.

1981 marks the beginning of his career as an international soloist, often associated with a pipe organ. He has collaborated with notable conductors such as Karl Münchinger, Seiji Ozawa and Karl Richter.

Happy in his art, he tries to share it through master classes. He created competitions like Prestige de la trompette de Guebwiller, or Concours international de quintettes de cuivres de Narbonne.

Since 2015, he has been artistic director of the Occitania chamber Orchestra.

He was made a chevalier of the Ordre des Arts et des Lettres in 2011.

References

External links 

 Biographie on artotal.com
 Biographie on concerts.fr
 Bernard SOUSTROT, trompette on Arcus caeli
 Bernard SOUSTROT, trompette on Trompettes et cordes
 Bernard Soustrot on YouTube
 Bernard Soustrot on Who's Who

1954 births
Living people
Musicians from Lyon
French music educators
French classical trumpeters
Male trumpeters
Chevaliers of the Ordre des Arts et des Lettres
Conservatoire de Paris alumni
21st-century trumpeters
21st-century French male musicians